PJ Torokvei (born Peter Torokvei; March 19, 1951 – July 3, 2013) was a Canadian screenwriter, actor, and television producer. A trans woman, her professional credits are generally under her deadname. In 2001, she announced to friends and family her intention to transition from her sex assigned at birth and undergo sex reassignment surgery.

Torokvei was involved with both The Second City and SCTV. Her notable works in film include the screenplays for Real Genius, Armed and Dangerous, Back to School and Guarding Tess. Her most notable work for television was as a producer and head writer on WKRP in Cincinnati. She appeared in and wrote for various television shows and films from the 1970s through the 1990s. She died at home  from liver failure on July 3, 2013, at the age of 62.

Filmography

Actor
The New Avengers (1977)
SCTV (1981)
I, Martin Short, Goes Hollywood (1989)
Hostage for a Day (1994)
Falling for You (1995)
Stuart Saves His Family (1995)

Producer
WKRP in Cincinnati (Producer - 2 episodes) (1981-1982)

Writer
SCTV (1981)
WKRP in Cincinnati (1979-1982)
Real Genius (with Neal Israel and Pat Proft) (1985)
Back to School (with Harold Ramis, Steven Kampmann and Will Porter) (1986)
Armed and Dangerous (with Harold Ramis) (1986)
Caddyshack II (with Harold Ramis) (1988)
The Earth Day Special (1990)
Guarding Tess (1994)
Hostage for a Day (with Kari Hildebrand and Robert David Crane) (1994)
A Dream Is a Wish Your Heart Makes (1995)

Career
In 1977 Torokvei joined the Toronto branch of Second City, where she met  writer/performer Steven Kampmann and Martin Short. Torokvei, Kampmann, and Short collaborated on a short comedy film called The Cisco Kid, which involved dubbing comic dialogue and sound effects onto an older western (much like Woody Allen's What's Up, Tiger Lily?). The film was later broadcast on Canadian TV as an "extra" episode on SCTV. In 1979, Kampmann and Torokvei went to Los Angeles after The Cisco Kid came to the attention of Hugh Wilson, who invited them to come in and pitch WKRP script ideas. Torokvei would eventually become head writer and stay until near the end of the final season. Many of the show's most memorable and imaginative episodes, including "Real Families," "Daydreams," and "Rumors" were written by Torokvei.

Awards 
In both 1981 and 1982, Torokvei (as Peter Torokvei) was nominated for Outstanding Comedy Series at the Primetime Emmy Awards in her role as producer on WKRP in Cincinnati. She is often cited as one of the first transgender people to be nominated for an Emmy.

References

External links

1951 births
2013 deaths
20th-century Canadian screenwriters
Canadian television writers
Canadian television actresses
Canadian television producers
Transgender actresses
Canadian transgender writers
Canadian comedy writers
Deaths from liver failure
Canadian women television writers
Canadian women television producers
Transgender screenwriters
Canadian LGBT screenwriters
Canadian women screenwriters
20th-century Canadian LGBT people